March 24 - Eastern Orthodox liturgical calendar - March 26

All fixed commemorations below are observed on April 7 by Orthodox Churches on the Old Calendar.

For March 25th, Orthodox Churches on the Old Calendar commemorate the Saints listed on March 12.

Feasts

 The Annunciation of Our Most Holy Lady, the Theotokos and Ever-Virgin Mary.

Saints

 Saint Dismas the Good Thief, crucified next to Christ (1st century)  (see also: October 12)
 Martyrs Pelagia, Theodosia, and Dula, at Caesarea Palestinae, by the sword (361)
 The Holy Martyr who was formerly an executioner.
 Venerable Sennouphios the Standard-bearer, of Latomos Monastery in Thessalonica (9th century)
 Venerable Timon the Hermit (10th century).

Pre-Schism Western saints

 Holy 262 Martyrs of Rome.
 Saint Quirinus of Tegernsee (Quirinus of Rome), a martyr who suffered in Rome under Claudius II (c. 269)
 Saint Irenaeus of Sirmium, Bishop in Pannonia (Hungary), martyred under Diocletian at Sirmium (Mitrovica) (304)  (see also: March 26)
 Saint Caimin of Inis Cealtra, Bishop-Abbot of Inis Cealtra and possibly the first Bishop of Killaloe (653) (see also: March 24)
 Saint Humbert of Maroilles, a disciple of St Amandus who helped found the monastery of Marolles in Belgium (c. 680)
 Saint Hermenland (Hermeland, Herbland, Erblon), monk at Fontenelle, ordained priest and sent with twelve monks to establish a new monastery on the island of Aindre (Indret) in the estuary of the Loire (c. 720)
 Saints Barontius and Desiderius (c. 725)
 Saint Kennocha (Kyle, Enoch), nun at a convent in Fife, held in great veneration in Scotland, especially around Glasgow (1007)
 Saint Ælfwold, a monk at Winchester who was chosen as Bishop of Sherborne in 1045 (1058)

Post-Schism Orthodox saints

 Saint Nicander, hermit, of Pskov (1582) (see also: September 24)
 Venerable Parthenius of the Kiev Caves (1855)
 Venerable Savvas the New of Kalymnos (1947)  (see also: March 24; April 7 - Greek; the fifth Sunday of Great Lent) 
 Saint Justin (Popovic), Archimandrite of Ćelije Monastery in Serbia and Confessor of Traditional Orthodoxy (1979) <small>(see also: June 1)</small>

New martyrs and confessors

 New Hieroconfessor Tikhon, Patriarch of Moscow and all Russia (1925)

Other commemorations

 Greek Independence Day: Proclamation of Greek independence on March 25, 1821, blessed by Metropolitan Germanos III of Old Patras at the Monastery of Agia Lavra..

Icons

 Synaxis of the Most Holy Theotokos the Burning Bush, on Mount Sinai (Our Lady of the Burning Bush).
 Synaxis of the Most Holy Theotokos Evangelístria, kept at the monastery of Aliartos in Boeotia.
 Synaxis of the Most Holy Theotokos of Kypera, kept at the monastery of the Panagia, on the island of Cephalonia.
 "Annunciation" Icon of the Mother of God (16th century)

Icon gallery

Notes

References

Sources
 March 25/April 7. Orthodox Calendar (PRAVOSLAVIE.RU).
 April 7 / March 25. HOLY TRINITY RUSSIAN ORTHODOX CHURCH (A parish of the Patriarchate of Moscow).
 March 25. OCA - The Lives of the Saints.
 The Autonomous Orthodox Metropolia of Western Europe and the Americas (ROCOR). St. Hilarion Calendar of Saints for the year of our Lord 2004. St. Hilarion Press (Austin, TX). p. 24.
 March 25. Latin Saints of the Orthodox Patriarchate of Rome.
 The Roman Martyrology. Transl. by the Archbishop of Baltimore. Last Edition, According to the Copy Printed at Rome in 1914. Revised Edition, with the Imprimatur of His Eminence Cardinal Gibbons. Baltimore: John Murphy Company, 1916. pp. 86–87.
 Rev. Richard Stanton. A Menology of England and Wales, or, Brief Memorials of the Ancient British and English Saints Arranged According to the Calendar, Together with the Martyrs of the 16th and 17th Centuries. London: Burns & Oates, 1892. pp. 132–134.
Greek Sources
 Great Synaxaristes:  25 ΜΑΡΤΙΟΥ. ΜΕΓΑΣ ΣΥΝΑΞΑΡΙΣΤΗΣ.
  Συναξαριστής. 25 Μαρτίου.'' ECCLESIA.GR. (H ΕΚΚΛΗΣΙΑ ΤΗΣ ΕΛΛΑΔΟΣ). 
Russian Sources
  7 апреля (25 марта). Православная Энциклопедия под редакцией Патриарха Московского и всея Руси Кирилла (электронная версия). (Orthodox Encyclopedia - Pravenc.ru).
  25 марта (ст.ст.) 7 апреля 2013 (нов. ст.). Русская Православная Церковь Отдел внешних церковных связей. (DECR).

March in the Eastern Orthodox calendar